The Caudron C.43 was the first French five-engined aircraft, a biplane intended for passenger transport or military use and multi-engined for safety. A development of the three-engined Caudron C.39, it had one tractor configuration engine in the nose and two push-pull pairs between the wings. It was capable of carrying eight passengers but was not developed.

Design and development

Apart from its engine configuration, the C.43 was conventional and shared its airframe with the three-engined C.39. The first five engine aircraft built in France, it was a three bay biplane with fabric-covered, rectangular-plan wings mounted without stagger. The lower wing had dihedral outboard of the engines, reducing the large interwing gap from  inboard to  outboard. The wings were joined by vertical pairs of interplane struts, the forward members attached near the leading edges, and the centre section was supported by similar, shorter cabane struts from the upper fuselage. The inner bay was defined by two close pairs of interplane struts, which between them supported the push-pull pairs of  Le Rhône 9C nine-cylinder rotary engines about halfway between the wings. Each pair was mounted in a long, cylindrical cowling. Its ailerons, on the upper wing only, were aerodynamically balanced by overhanging extensions beyond the tips, as on the C.39.

The pilot and engineer had a very large, open cockpit, with an impressive array of levers controlling the five engines. Behind the wings the fuselage tapered gently to a broad, triangular fin which carried a vertical edged unbalanced rudder that reached down to the keel. As the tailplane was mounted on top of the fuselage, its elevators had a notch for rudder movement.

The C.43 had a fixed tailskid undercarriage. There were pairs of mainwheels mounted on single axles attached to a longitudinal bar held under the engine on short V-struts. To prevent nose-overs, there was a fifth wheel mounted under the nose. The wheels could be replaced by flat sided floats, each fixed to the fuselage by two pairs of inverted V-struts, one to each side of the float.  Though in floatplane configuration the C.43 sat level over the water, the tailskid was joined by a small, cylindrical float to protect the tail at take-off.

The main reason for having five engines was safety. There is no evidence in contemporary sources that passenger accommodation or armament was ever fitted.

The C.43, along with the C.39 and all but one other competitors, was unsuccessful at the Monaco Grand Prix for seaplanes, held in the spring of 1920.

The sole example was purchased by the Section Technique de l'Aéronautique (S.T.Aé.) to investigate the instrumentation and control requirements of multi-engined aircraft.

Specifications

References

Five-engined push-pull aircraft
C.043
1920s French airliners
Biplanes